The list of militias in the Lebanese civil war does not include the "legal" Lebanese Army; note that the Army split into two major parts:
The Maronite-led "legal" Lebanese Army favoured the Lebanese Front government
The Muslim "Lebanese Arab Army" fought for the rival Lebanese National Movement government

In addition, there was an autonomous faction within the "legal" Lebanese Army called the Army of Free Lebanon. It formed in 1976 and was composed of Maronites and Greek-Catholics reacting against the split with the mainly Muslim Lebanese Arab Army. It continued to be paid by the government, and was fully re-integrated into the "legal" army in 1978, with the exception of some units which chose instead to form the South Lebanon Army listed below.

List

See also
Lebanese Armed Forces
Lebanese Civil War
List of armed groups in the Syrian Civil War
Weapons of the Lebanese Civil War

References

Lebanon
Military history of Lebanon
 
Lists of armed groups